Donny Jamal Green (born September 18, 1977) is a former American football linebacker in the National Football League. He played for the Washington Redskins and the Jacksonville Jaguars, and played college football at the University of Virginia.

References

1977 births
Living people
People from Jesup, Georgia
Players of American football from Georgia (U.S. state)
American football linebackers
Virginia Cavaliers football players
Washington Redskins players
Jacksonville Jaguars players
Georgia Force players